Ognjenović is a Serbian surname, a patronymic derived from the masculine given name Ognjen. It may refer to:

Maja Ognjenović (born 1984), volleyball player
Mirjana Ognjenović (born 1953), handball player
Perica Ognjenović (born 1977), footballer
Svetlana Ognjenović (born 1981), handball player
Vida Ognjenović (born 1941), writer

See also
Ognjanović

Serbian surnames